Indian Lake Village is an upscale retail, office, and residential development located in Hendersonville, Tennessee. The  development was developed by Halo Properties, and the first phase opened in 2008. Indian Lake Village includes the Streets of Indian Lake, a  square foot outdoor shopping center developed by Continental Real Estate Cos.

References

External links
Indian Lake Village Official web site
Streets of Indian Lake Official web site

Shopping malls in Tennessee
Shopping malls established in 2008
Buildings and structures in Sumner County, Tennessee
Tourist attractions in Sumner County, Tennessee